Laurence O'Neill  (4 March 1864 – 26 July 1943) was an Irish politician and corn merchant. O'Neill was elected to Dáil Éireann as an independent Teachta Dála (TD) for Dublin Mid at the 1922 general election. He did not contest the 1923 general election and he was an unsuccessful candidate at the September 1927 general election.

He was elected to the Irish Free State Seanad Éireann at a by-election on 20 June 1929 to fill the vacancy caused by the resignation of Henry Petty-Fitzmaurice. He was re-elected to the Seanad for a 9-year term in 1931 and served until the Free State Seanad was abolished in 1936. He was nominated by the Taoiseach on 2 January 1940 to the 3rd Seanad. He did not contest the 1943 Seanad election.

He had also served as Lord Mayor of Dublin from 1917 to 1924, serving through the Irish War of Independence and the Irish Civil War.

See also
 Conscription Crisis of 1918

References

Further reading
 

1864 births
1943 deaths
Independent TDs
Members of the 3rd Dáil
Members of the 1928 Seanad
Members of the 1931 Seanad
Members of the 1934 Seanad
Members of the 3rd Seanad
Lord Mayors of Dublin
Members of the Senate of Southern Ireland
People of the Irish Civil War (Pro-Treaty side)
Nominated members of Seanad Éireann
Independent members of Seanad Éireann
People educated at Belvedere College